Matthew Hays is a Canadian film critic, writer, film festival programmer and academic. He won a Lambda Literary Award for his 2007 book The View from Here: Conversations with Gay and Lesbian Filmmakers.

Hays teaches film studies, journalism and communication studies at Concordia University in Montreal, and has reviewed films for the Montreal Mirror. His writing has also been published in The Globe and Mail, The Guardian, Xtra!, The Walrus, Vice and The Advocate, and he has been a programmer for the Toronto International Film Festival. He was nominated for a 2008 National Magazine Award.

Hays is openly gay.

Hays earned an MA in Media Studies from Concordia University in Montreal in 2008.

References

Anglophone Quebec people
Canadian film critics
Academic staff of Concordia University
Canadian gay writers
Lambda Literary Award winners
Living people
Canadian LGBT journalists
Journalists from Montreal
Writers from Montreal
Canadian magazine writers
Year of birth missing (living people)